The parrot subfamily Psittaculinae consists of three tribes: the Polytelini with three genera, the Psittaculini or Asian psittacines, and the pygmy parrots of the Micropsittini tribe.

Genera 
Tribe Micropsittini:
 Genus Micropsitta
 Buff-faced pygmy parrot, Micropsitta pusio
 Yellow-capped pygmy parrot, Micropsitta keiensis
 Geelvink pygmy parrot, Micropsitta geelvinkiana
 Meek's pygmy parrot, Micropsitta meeki
 Finsch's pygmy parrot, Micropsitta finschii
 Red-breasted pygmy parrot, Micropsitta bruijnii

Tribe Polytelini:
 Genus Alisterus
 Australian king parrot, Alisterus scapularis
 Moluccan king parrot, Alisterus amboinensis
 Papuan king parrot, Alisterus chloropterus
 Genus Aprosmictus
 Jonquil parrot, Aprosmictus jonquillaceus
 Red-winged parrot, Aprosmictus erythropterus
 Genus Polytelis
 Superb parrot, Polytelis swainsonii
 Regent parrot, Polytelis anthopeplus
 Princess parrot, Polytelis alexandrae

Tribe Psittaculini:
 Genus Psittinus
 Blue-rumped parrot, Psittinus cyanurus
 Simeulue parrot, Psittinus abbotti
 Genus Geoffroyus
 Red-cheeked parrot, Geoffroyus geoffroyi
 Blue-collared parrot, Geoffroyus simplex
 Song parrot, Geoffroyus heteroclitus
 Rennell parrot, Geoffroyus hyacinthinus
 Genus Prioniturus
 Montane racket-tail, Prioniturus montanus
 Mindanao racket-tail, Prioniturus waterstradti
 Blue-headed racket-tail, Prioniturus platenae
 Green racket-tail, Prioniturus luconensis
 Blue-crowned racket-tail, Prioniturus discurus
 Blue-winged racket-tail, Prioniturus verticalis (also known as Sulu Racquet-tail)
 Yellow-breasted racket-tail, Prioniturus flavicans
 Golden-mantled racket-tail, Prioniturus platurus
 Buru racket-tail, Prioniturus mada
 Mindoro racket-tail, Prioniturus mindorensis
 Genus Tanygnathus
 Great-billed parrot, Tanygnathus megalorynchos
 Blue-naped parrot, Tanygnathus lucionensis
 Blue-backed parrot, Tanygnathus sumatranus
 Black-lored parrot, Tanygnathus gramineus
 Genus Eclectus
 Moluccan eclectus, Eclectus roratus
 Sumba eclectus, Eclectus cornelia
 Tanimbar eclectus, Eclectus riedeli
 Papuan eclectus, Eclectus polychloros
   Oceanic eclectus, Eclectus infectus (extinct or prehistoric)
 Genus Psittacula
 Alexandrine parakeet, Psittacula eupatria
   Seychelles parakeet, Psittacula wardi 
 Rose-ringed parakeet, Psittacula krameri
 Echo parakeet, Psittacula eques
   Newton's parakeet, Psittacula exsul 
 Slaty-headed parakeet, Psittacula himalayana
 Grey-headed parakeet, Psittacula finschii
 Plum-headed parakeet, Psittacula cyanocephala
 Blossom-headed parakeet, Psittacula roseata
 Blue-winged parakeet, Psittacula columboides
 Layard's parakeet, Psittacula calthropae
 Lord Derby's parakeet, Psittacula derbiana
 Red-breasted parakeet, Psittacula alexandri
 Nicobar parakeet, Psittacula caniceps
 Long-tailed parakeet, Psittacula longicauda
   Mascarene grey parakeet, Psittacula bensoni
    Genus Lophopsittacus
   Broad-billed parrot, Lophopsittacus mauritianus
   Genus Necropsittacus 
   Rodrigues parrot Necropsittacus rodericanus
   Genus Mascarinus
   Mascarene parrot Mascarinus mascarin 

The subdivisions within the genus Psittacula are controversial, as recent genetic studies indicate that it is paraphyletic. Thus, suggestions have been made to either split the genus into 6 different genera or keep Psittacula as it is but include Tanygnathus, Psittinus, and Mascarinus within it.

References 

 
Psittaculidae